Casa de huéspedes (English title:Guesthouses) is a Mexican telenovela produced by Televisa and transmitted by Telesistema Mexicano.

Cast 
Ofelia Guilmáin
Antonio Medellín
Héctor Suárez
María Rojo
Dalia Íñiguez

References 

Mexican telenovelas
1965 telenovelas
Televisa telenovelas
Spanish-language telenovelas
1965 Mexican television series debuts
1965 Mexican television series endings